Obetsebi is a surname of Ghanaian origin. Notable people with this surname include:

 Emmanuel Obetsebi-Lamptey (1902–1963), Ghanaian politician
 Jacob Otanka Obetsebi-Lamptey (born 1946), Ghanaian politician, television and radio producer, and businessman, son of Emmanuel

Surnames of African origin